Dog Hill is a mountain in Greene County, New York. It is located in the Catskill Mountains north-northeast of Prattsville. Prospect Hill is located southwest, and Pratt Rocks is located south of Dog Hill.

References

Mountains of Greene County, New York
Mountains of New York (state)